Amarachi Favour Obiajunwa (born 10 October 1989) is a female freestyle wrestler from Nigeria who has participated at the Olympic Games.

At the 2008 Summer Olympics she competed in the women's freestyle wrestling 72 kg event. She lost in the 1/8 of final to Ali Bernard from United States. At the 2012 Summer Olympics she again competed in the women's freestyle wrestling 72 kg event, and was defeated in the last 16 by Wang Jiao of China.

References

External links
 Athlete bio on beijing2008.com
 

Living people
1989 births
Wrestlers at the 2008 Summer Olympics
Wrestlers at the 2012 Summer Olympics
Olympic wrestlers of Nigeria
Nigerian female sport wrestlers
21st-century Nigerian women